The Bishop of Canberra and Goulburn is the diocesan bishop of the Anglican Diocese of Canberra and Goulburn, Australia. The office was established in 1863 as the Bishop of Goulburn, and its name was changed to its present name in 1950.

List of Bishops of Canberra and Goulburn
References
Notes

Bibliography

External links

 – official site

 
 
Lists of Anglican bishops and archbishops
Anglican bishops of Canberra and Goulburn